The Niellim language (autonym lwaà) is a Bua language spoken by some 5,000 people (as of 1993) along the Chari River in southern Chad.  It is mainly spoken in two areas: one around the city of Sarh (to which many - perhaps most - speakers have migrated) and one, its traditional home, further north, between about 9°30′ and 9°50′ N, corresponding to the former chiefdoms of Pra, Niellim, and Niou.

Niellim borders on several languages of diverse families – in particular Sara, Ndam, and Laal – and is influenced by the local lingua franca, Baguirmi; it has itself strongly influenced Laal, but also apparently has been influenced by Laal, or a relative of Laal, since much of the common Laal–Niellim vocabulary is not Bua.  It is notably homogeneous.  As a small minority in Chad, its speakers usually have to learn other languages, mostly (as of 1974) Baguirmi, Sara, Arabic, and Bua.

Phonology

The consonants are:

Complex vowel harmony, rather similar to that found in Laal, is observable.

There are three tone levels: low, mid, high.  Any syllable must bear at least one tone; it may bear any combination of two tones, or one of three three-tone combinations: LML, MLH, or HLH.

Grammar

Syntax
The typical word order is subject–verb–object (though this can be affected by topic fronting); preposition - prepositional object (- postposition); noun - adjective; possessed - possessor.  However, possessive pronouns precede the noun.

Pronouns
The basic personal pronouns include: n "I", m "you", r "he, she, it" (with low tone as subjects, high tone as objects), í "you (pl.)", á "they".  ("We" does not appear in sources so far examined by the editors.)

Nouns
Noun plural formation is quite complex, and includes some apparent relics of a now-absent noun class system; the commonest ways include combinations of internal vowel ablaut, the suffix -gɨ, a change l/n > r, and/or replacing final -a with -i.

Verbs
Each verb has two forms: indicative and optative ("injunctive" in Boyeldieu's terminology.)  They are distinguished by tonal pattern.

Verbs may be preceded by various particles to indicate tense, aspect, and mood: for instance wò continuous, ɓə future, ká obligation.  Indirect quoted speech is preceded with the particle ɓə "that".

Verbal nouns may be formed by changing the tone pattern and/or suffixing -li or -la (in which the l becomes n following a nasal) together with internal vowel ablaut.

Verb derivational suffixes include -n intensive (realized as -nì or -ɨ̀n, e.g. nun "bite" > nùnɨ̀n "gnaw", and sometimes causing internal ablaut), and -gɨ̀ mediopassive (sometimes -gi or -gu, rarely causes internal ablaut).

Prepositions

Common prepositions include gɨ̀ "to (dative)", naà "with", ti "to".

Examples

 ɓá̰ tɨba ti ʔùu:l, sì sì, tén w̃àɲ, kà ŕ lápyaà.
 child fall road, go go, find chief, do him hello.
 The child set off, walked and walked, found the chief and greeted him.
 á na ŕ ndúu: ní ŕ ɲì.
 they give him water he drink
 They gave him water to drink.
 jée:l lá ŕ ʔwa̰ ŕ ɓi:r tén w̃àɲ:
 evening too he get-up he ask chief:
 In the evening he got up and asked the chief:
 w̃àɲ, ɲìin hina ḿ ɓá̰ tàa:m. ɛɛ̀, pàáy kəə̀y? ǹ tà:m ḿ ɓá̰ càaw.
 chief I(emph.) come you child seek, eh, is-it what?, I want you child marry (verbal noun)
 "Chief, I have come to seek your daughter; I want to marry your daughter."

(From a story recounted by Dakour Yalka Ali, in Boyeldieu 1985, p. 10)

References

 P. Boyeldieu, La langue lua ("niellim") (Groupe Boua - Moyen-Chari, Tchad) Phonologie - Morphologie - Dérivation verbale.  Descriptions des langues et monographes ethnologuistiques, 1.  Cambridge University Press & Editions de la Maison des Sciences de l'Homme for SELAF.  Paris 1985.   (CUP).  (A source for this article.)
 P. Boyeldieu, "Esquisse phonologique du lua ("niellim") de Niou (Moyen-Chari)", in Jean-Paul Caprile (ed.), Etudes phonologiques tchadiennes, Paris:SELAF 1977.
 Pascal Boyeldieu and C. Seignobos, "Contribution à l'étude du pays niellim (Moyen-Chari - Tchad)", L'homme et le milieu, Aspects du développement au Tchad, Série: Lettres, Langues vivantes et Sciences humaines, no. 3, 1975, pp. 67–98. Includes an 80-word comparative list for Niellim and three Tunia varieties, with some remarks on regular correspondences
 P. Boyeldieu & C. Seignobos, Contribution à l'étude du pays niellim, Université du Tchad / INTSH, N'djamena, 1974.  Includes word lists for Kwa Tchini (Niellim dialect) and Kwa Perim (Tunia dialect).
 M. Gaudefroy-Demombynes, Documents sur les langues de l'Oubangui-Chari, Paris, 1907.  Includes (pp. 107–122) a 200-word comparative list of Bua, Niellim, Fanian, and Tunia, with a brief grammar and some phrases collected by Decorse.
 J. Lukas, Zentralsudanisches Studien, Hamburg, Friedrichsen, de Gruyter & Cie, 1937.  Gives the wordlists of Nachtigal, zu Mecklenburg, Barth, and Gaudefroy-Demombynes for Bua (~400 words), Niellim (~200 words), and Koke (~100 words).
 P. Palayer, "Notes sur les Noy du Moyen-Chari (Tchad)", Les langues du groupe Boua, N'djamena, I.N.S.H., "Etudes et documents tchadiens", Série C (Linguistique), no. 2, pp. 196–219.  Elements of Noy, plus a 50-word comparative list of Noy, Niellim (2 dialects), Tunia, Iro Gula.

External links
 Niellim

Bua languages
Languages of Chad